John Norris Hewett (c. 1745 – 1790), born Fisher, was an English art collector and amateur artist.

The date and location of Hewett's birth is unknown; it has been posited that she was a native of Penicuik. Also unknown is the origin of her unusual forename, though it has been suggested that it was chosen to placate her grandfather, Admiral John Norris, after her mother remarried against his wishes. Her father was Robert Fisher of Sandieford, a member of the Royal Company of Scottish Archers. She married three times. In 1764 she married Captain John Gordon of the 50th Foot of Ireland, who later divorced her for adultery. In 1773 she married Admiral John Storr, acquiring from him a house in Bedford Square and a life interest in a number of Yorkshire estates. Soon after his death she married once again; her third husband was John Hewett, né Thornhaugh, MP and Sheriff of Nottinghamshire. Norris Hewett died at home in Richmond, her age given variously as 45 and 47 in contemporary sources. Thanks to an ambiguity in her will, her heirs took up litigation against one another, settling it in 1791. Two posthumous sales of her art collection were held by Christie's in 1792. Among the works available were pieces by Hubert Robert, John Russell, and Jean Christophe Dietsch, as well as a large number of pieces by her own hand. These were largely copies, after such painters as Angelika Kauffmann, John Reynolds, Guido Reni, William Peters, and Russell. Their medium is unknown, though it is suspected many may have been pastels. None are known to survive, save potentially one, a copy of The Resurrection of a Pious Family by Peters, which turned up at auction in 2015 with no attribution.

References

1740s births
Year of birth uncertain
1790 deaths
English art collectors
Women collectors
English women painters
18th-century English painters
18th-century English women artists